Franklin Richard van Soldt (born July 28, 1953) is a former Dutch ice hockey player. He played for the Netherlands men's national ice hockey team at the 1980 Winter Olympics in Lake Placid.

References

External links

1953 births
Living people
Dutch ice hockey forwards
Heerenveen Flyers players
Ice hockey players at the 1980 Winter Olympics
Olympic ice hockey players of the Netherlands
Sportspeople from Amsterdam